Ahmed Atef Daraghmeh (simply known as Ahmed Daraghmeh, or some news media reported Ahmad Atef Daragmah, 24 November 1999 – 22 December 2022) was a former Palestinian footballer previously for West Bank Premier League team, Thaqafi Tulkarem. He is known for his death in Nablus, Palestine, due to the successive shots fired by the Israeli Army at him.

Death
He died in 2022 due to multiple gunshots from the Israeli Army in Nablus, Palestine. He was known to be a resident of Tubas, a town located north of the West Bank. At the time of his death he was 23 years old, and had previously played for Thaqafi Tulkarem in the West Bank Premier League.

Notes

References

1999 births
2022 deaths
Palestinian footballers
Thaqafi Tulkarem players
Deaths by firearm in the West Bank
People from Tubas Governorate